The Afon Twymyn is a river in Powys, Mid Wales.

From its source at the 40-metre high Ffrwd Fawr waterfall and head of the Pennant Valley near Dylife the river flows through Llanbrynmair before joining the River Dyfi upstream of Cemmaes Road.

See also 
 Dylife Gorge

Rivers of Powys